Bandan (also Romanized as Bandān) is a village in Bandan Rural District, in the Central District of Nehbandan County, South Khorasan Province, Iran. At the 2006 census, its population was 946, in 222 families.

References 

Populated places in Nehbandan County